The following is a list of succulent invasive plants of South Africa as per the South African Ministry of Environment, Forestry and Fisheries.

List

References

External links 
 
 
 NGO list - https://www.invasives.org.za/plants/plants-a-z

Invasive plant species in South Africa
Invasive succulent plants